An Alien Enemy is a 1918 American silent war drama film directed by Wallace Worsley and starring Louise Glaum, Mary Jane Irving and Thurston Hall.

Cast
 Louise Glaum as Neysa von Igel / Frau Meyer
 Mary Jane Irving as Fräulein Bertha Meyer
 Thurston Hall as	David J. Hale
 Albert Allardt as Emil Koenig
 Charles Hammond as Adolph Schmidt
 Jay Morley as Mayor Samuel J. Putnam
 Roy Laidlaw as Lewis Meyer
 Joseph J. Dowling as Baron von Mecklin
 Clifford Alexander as Wireless Operator

References

Bibliography
 Slide, Anthony. Aspects of American Film History Prior to 1920. Scarecrow Press, 1978.

External links
 
 An Alien Enemy at Silentera

1918 films
1918 drama films
1910s English-language films
American silent feature films
Silent American drama films
American black-and-white films
Films directed by Wallace Worsley
Films distributed by W. W. Hodkinson Corporation
1910s American films